Ongjin County is a county in Incheon Metropolitan City, South Korea. It consists of a group of islands in the Yellow Sea (West Sea).

Four of the islands, Yeonpyeong Island, Baengnyeong, Daecheong, and Socheong Islands, are very near the Northern Limit Line. They are close to the Ongjin Peninsula of South Hwanghae Province in North Korea, at a considerable distance from the nearest part of the South Korean mainland. These islands are popular destinations for tourism. In historical contexts these three islands and their smaller neighbors are sometimes known as the Sir James Hall Group after Sir James Hall, whose son Basil Hall was an early Western visitor to Korea.

History
Once a part of the Lolang district of the Han Empire before the 4th century, this area was known as Ongcheon during the Three Kingdoms period. It was bestowed with the name in use today - Ongjin - during the reign of King Taejo of Goryeo, the founder of the Goryeo Dynasty. Then in 1018, during the 9th year of King Hyeonjong's reign over Goryeo, the county was established as one of the major administrative divisions in the heartland of the kingdom.

Administration

The Ongjin County seat is located outside of the county itself, in Nam-gu, Incheon. There is also an Ongjin County in South Hwanghae Province, North Korea. This chain of islands was originally a part of South Hwanghae province before the Partition of Korea in 1948.

Administrative divisions
Ongjin County is divided into seven townships ("myeon").

 Bukdo-myeon (북도면), which includes Sindo, Sido, and Modo
 Yeonpyeong-myeon (연평면), on Yeonpyeong Island
 Baengnyeong-myeon (백령면), on Baengnyeong Island
 Daecheong-myeon (대청면), on Daecheong Island and Socheong Island
 Deokjeok-myeon (덕적면), which includes Deokjeokdo
 Jawol-myeon (자월면), which includes Seongapdo, which is where the 2021 Netflix series Squid Game was filmed.
 Yeongheung-myeon (영흥면)

Tourism
It is difficult to reach Ongjin County because of its proximity to North Korea and its distance from South Korean areas.

The coast and islands feature many gravel beaches, some of which (such as Guridong beach and Gulubdo beach) feature fantastic eroded stone outcroppings. There are also large mudflats, which are a popular tourist destination.

See also
 Geography of South Korea

References

External links
County government web site 

 
Counties of Incheon